Saikhom Mirabai Chanu (Meitei pronunciation: /sái.kʰom mi.ra.bái cə.nu/; born 8 August 1994) is an Indian weightlifter. 27-year-old Mirabai Chanu lifted a total of 201 kg to win the Gold Medal at the CWG 2022. She won the silver medal at the 2020 Tokyo Olympics in the Women's 49 kg category. Mirabai Chanu has won the World Championships and multiple medals at the Commonwealth Games. She was awarded the Padma Shri by the Government of India for her contributions to the sport. She was awarded the sporting honour Major Dhyan Chand Khel Ratna by the Government of India in 2018.

Chanu won the silver medal in the women's 48 kg weight class at the 2014 Commonwealth Games, Glasgow; she went on to break the games record en route to the gold medal at the 2018 edition of the event held in Gold Coast. Prior to the 2020 Summer Olympics, her biggest achievement came in 2017, when she won the gold medal at World Weightlifting Championships held in Anaheim, California. She is the current world record holder in Clean & Jerk in the 49 kg category.

Early life and background

Saikhom Mirabai Chanu was born on 8 August 1994 in Nongpok Kakching about 30 km away from Imphal city, Manipur to a Meitei family, a warrior clan of that region. Chanu identified herself as a follower of Sanamahism but also stated she worships Hindu deities as well. Her family identified her strength when she was just 12. She could easily carry a huge bundle of firewood home when her elder brother found it hard to even pick it up.

Mirabai trained at the Sports Academy in Manipur. She hitched rides with truck drivers carrying sand. After winning the Olympic medal, she invited the truck drivers to offer her gratitude and touched their feet as a sign of respect.

Career 

Chanu's first major breakthrough came at the Glasgow edition of the Commonwealth Games; she won the silver medal in the 48 kg weight category.

2016 Rio Olympics 

Chanu qualified for the 2016 Rio Olympics in the women's 48 kg category. However, she failed to complete the event, owing to no successful lifts in any of her three attempts in the clean & jerk section.

2017–2021
In 2017, she won the gold medal in the Women's 48 kg category by lifting a competition record 194 kg in total (85 kg snatch and 109 kg clean & jerk) in the 2017 World Weightlifting Championships held at Anaheim, California, United States.

Chanu lifted a total of 196 kg, 86 kg in Snatch, and 110 kg in Clean and Jerk to win the first gold medal for India in the 2018 Commonwealth Games. En route to the medal, she broke the game's record for her weight category; the effort also marked her personal best performance. She missed out on a bronze medal in the 49 kg category at 2019 Asian Weightlifting Championships with a total lift of 199 kg, her personal best, as her Snatch weight was lower than the third-place athlete, both of whom had identical totals.

At the 2019 World Weightlifting Championships, Mirabai lifted a total of 201 kg (87 kg Snatch and 114 kg Clean & Jerk) to finish fourth. This personal best total also created a new national record in the 49 kg category. She broke her personal record again four months later when she lifted 203 kg (88 kg in Snatch and 115 kg in Clean & Jerk,) in the 49 kg category to win the gold medal at the 2020 Senior National Weightlifting Championships.

In April 2021, she won the bronze medal at the 2020 Asian Weightlifting Championships in Tashkent where she lifted 86 kg in snatch and then created the world record by lifting 119 kg in the clean and jerk, for a total of 205 kg. In June 2021, Chanu became the only Indian woman weightlifter to qualify for the 2020 Summer Olympics by securing a second position on the Absolute Rankings for the 49 kg category.

2020 Tokyo Olympics 

Chanu won the silver medal in 49 kg division at the 2020 Summer Olympics in Tokyo with a total lift of 202 kg, becoming the first Indian weightlifter to win silver at the Olympics, the second Indian weightlifter after Karnam Malleswari to win an Olympic medal, and the second Indian woman after P. V. Sindhu to win an Olympic silver. A new Olympic record was registered by Chanu with a successful lift of 115 kg in clean and jerk. Her win ensured India its first medal at the Tokyo Olympics.

Aftermath of Tokyo Olympic Manipur Chief Minister N. Biren Singh announced an award of 1 crore for her. Indian Railway Minister Ashwini Vaishnaw announced an award of ₹2 crores, promotion, and more for her. Domino's Pizza India also offered her free pizza for life.

2022 Birmingham Commonwealth Games
Chanu won gold medal in 49 kg category at Commonwealth Games 2022 held at Birmingham, England. She lifted a total of 201 kg in snatch and cleaned and jerk.

Major results

Awards

National 
 Major Dhyan Chand Khel Ratna, the highest sporting honor of India (2018)
 Padma Shri, the fourth highest civilian award of India (2018)

Rewards
For winning the silver medal at the 2020 Tokyo Summer Olympics -
 rupees from BYJU'S
  from the Government of India.
  from the Government of Manipur, and appointment as Additional Superintendent of Police (Sports) in the Manipur State Police.
  from the Ministry of Railways (India) and promotion in the Northeast Frontier Railway.
 from the Board of Control for Cricket in India
 from the Indian Olympic Association.
 Other rewards
  from the Government of Manipur for the gold medal in the 2017 World Weightlifting Championships.
  from the Government of Manipur for qualifying for the 2020 Tokyo Summer Olympics.
  from the Government of Manipur for participating in the 2020 Tokyo Summer Olympics.

In popular culture

Mei Iklaba Thamoi (play) 
Mei Iklaba Thamoi is a Meitei language Shumang Kumhei play based on the life of Mirabai Chanu, directed by Shougrakpam Hemanta, released on 19 September 2021.

Upcoming film 
A biographical Manipuri feature film on Mirabai Chanu was also announced by Seuti Films. The movie will be directed by OC Meira and screenplay by Manaobi MM.

See also 

 India at the 2020 Summer Olympics

References

External links 

Living people
Meitei people
Indian female weightlifters
1994 births
Commonwealth Games silver medallists for India
Sportswomen from Manipur
Weightlifters at the 2014 Commonwealth Games
Weightlifters at the 2014 Asian Games
Weightlifters at the 2016 Summer Olympics
Olympic weightlifters of India
Commonwealth Games medallists in weightlifting
People from Imphal
21st-century Indian women
21st-century Indian people
World Weightlifting Championships medalists
Weightlifters from Manipur
Recipients of the Padma Shri in sports
Weightlifters at the 2018 Commonwealth Games
Weightlifters at the 2022 Commonwealth Games
Commonwealth Games gold medallists for India
Recipients of the Khel Ratna Award
Asian Games competitors for India
South Asian Games medalists in weightlifting
Weightlifters at the 2020 Summer Olympics
Olympic silver medalists for India
People from Manipur
Olympic medalists in weightlifting
Medalists at the 2020 Summer Olympics
20th-century Indian women
Medallists at the 2014 Commonwealth Games
Medallists at the 2018 Commonwealth Games
Medallists at the 2022 Commonwealth Games